Peschanka is a rural locality (a selo) in Novopoltavskoye Rural Settlement, Staropoltavsky District, Volgograd Oblast, Russia. The population was 146 as of 2010. There are 3 streets.

Geography 
Peschanka is located on the right bank of the Yeruslan River, 16 km south of Staraya Poltavka (the district's administrative centre) by road. Novaya Poltavka is the nearest rural locality.

References 

Rural localities in Staropoltavsky District